CMS Sri Jayawardenepura College is a government school in Kotte, Sri Lanka.

History
It was formerly known as Christian College until 1964 when the administration of the school was taken over by the government. The school traces its roots to 1822 when the Cotta Institute was established as a seminary for young Ceylonese of which the first principal was Rev. Samuel Lambrick.

The third principal of the Academy was Rev Joseph Marsh, who later became the first Head Master of Colombo Academy present Royal College Colombo in 1835. From 1855 to 1934 it was known as the Church Mission Society (CMS) Boys' School at Sri Jayawardenapura Kotte. The CMS Boys' School was a training institute for young Ceylonese, inclined to teach the gospel. The last principal of C.M.S. Christian College [1959-1963]  was Samuel Louis Alexander Ratnayake. Himself an old boy of Christian College, he added new buildings and organised many colorful activities, such as drama festivals, sports, and carnivals in addition to prize givings and sports meets. The school community was a mix of different ethnic groups and religions.

Battle of Kotte

The annual Big Match played between Sri Jayawardenepura Maha Vidyalaya and St. Thomas' College, Kotte is called Battle of Kotte.

Notable teachers
 Joseph Marsh - founding headmaster of Colombo Academy

Principals List
Mr. Gamini Hettiarachchi

Notable alumni
 Anagarika Dharmapala
 John de Silva
 Ananda Samarakoon
 P.D. Premasiri - professor specialising in buddhist ethics and philosophy at the University of Peradeniya

References

Educational institutions established in 1822
Former Church of Ceylon schools in the Diocese of Colombo
National schools in Sri Lanka
Schools in Sri Jayawardenepura Kotte
1822 establishments in the British Empire